Eccrisis muscaria is a species of beetle in the family Cerambycidae. It was described by Fairmaire in 1900.

References 

Dorcasominae
Beetles described in 1900